Godwin is an unincorporated community in Twin Falls County, Idaho, United States, roughly  southwest of Twin Falls. Godwin is located at the junction of U.S. Route 93 and Idaho State Highway 74.

Godwin is part of the Twin Falls, Idaho Metropolitan Statistical Area.

See also

References

Unincorporated communities in Idaho
Unincorporated communities in Twin Falls County, Idaho